Janko Tipsarević was the defending champion, but decided to participate at 2012 Erste Bank Open instead.
Andreas Seppi won the final over Brazilian Thomaz Bellucci with the score 3–6, 7–6(7–3), 6–3.

Seeds
The first four seeds received a bye into the second round.

Draw

Finals

Top half

Bottom half

Qualifying

Seeds

Qualifiers

Draw

First qualifier

Second qualifier

Third qualifier

Fourth qualifier

References
 Main Draw
 Qualifying Draw

Kremlin Cup - Singles
2012 Men's Singles